The Alpi Pioneer 200 is an Italian ultralight and light-sport aircraft, designed and produced by Alpi Aviation, of Pordenone. The aircraft is supplied as a kit for amateur construction or as a complete ready-to-fly-aircraft.

Design and development
The Pioneer 200 was designed to comply with the Fédération Aéronautique Internationale microlight rules and US light-sport aircraft rules. It features a cantilever low-wing, a two-seats-in-side-by-side configuration enclosed cockpit under a bubble canopy, fixed tricycle landing gear and a single engine in tractor configuration.

The aircraft is made from wood. Its  span wing is rectangular in planform to reduce construction costs. Standard engines available are the  Rotax 912UL and  Jabiru 2200.

Variants

Pioneer 200 Standard
Pioneer 200 Sauer
Model powered by a Sauer 1800 UL Volkswagen air-cooled engine.
Pioneer 200 Sparrow
Pioneer 200 Beluga
Model with extended turtle-deck baggage to carry extended length loads.
Pioneer 230
Model with optional equipment included as standard. Engines available are the  Rotax 912UL,  Rotax 912ULS and the  Rotax 912iS four stroke powerplants.

Specifications (Pioneer 200)

References

External links

2000s Italian ultralight aircraft
Homebuilt aircraft
Light-sport aircraft
Alpi Aviation aircraft
Single-engined tractor aircraft
Low-wing aircraft